The Nueva School is a private school, with two campuses—the lower and middle school in Hillsborough, and the high school in San Mateo, California—serving gifted students in pre-kindergarten through twelfth grade. Nueva was founded in 1967 by Karen Stone McCown. Originally, the Nueva School only served younger students, but in 2013 it expanded to include a high school, and a new campus for it was built as part of the Bay Meadows development in San Mateo, opening in August 2014.

Unique aspects of Nueva's curriculum include its focus on design thinking and social emotional learning. In his book That Used To Be Us, commentator Thomas Friedman lauded Nueva for its creativity-inspiring curriculum and overall philosophy.

Nueva is accredited by the Western Association of Schools and Colleges and the California Association of Independent Schools. It has received the Blue Ribbon Award from the U.S. Department of Education in 1988, 1997, and 2010. Nueva was rated the #3 private K-12 school and the #9 private high school in the United States by Niche in 2021.

History 
In 1965, Karen Stone McCown started planning a school for gifted and talented students, funded by her father-in-law W. Clement Stone. She convened a group of 17 Nobel Prize winners to discuss what kind of school would have suited them in their childhoods. Based on the meeting, she planned a school that would emphasize creativity, independence, active learning, and social and emotional learning. A board with members including Ernest "Jack" Hilgard and Meredith Wilson helped to found the school. In 1967, the school was founded on Sand Hill Road in Menlo Park, California, starting with students in kindergarten, first, and second grade, with the intention of adding one grade each year until the sixth grade. In 1971, it moved to Crocker Mansion in Hillsborough, California. In 2013, the school further expanded to the high school level.

Academics 
The Nueva School is known for having a progressive curriculum utilizing project-based learning.

Computer science classes are required, and there are also several elective computer science courses, including a two-semester sequence on machine learning. In mathematics, there is an integrated core curriculum, along with advanced elective classes in the upper school including multivariable calculus and complex analysis. Advanced science courses include applied molecular biology and experimental bioorganic chemistry. Spanish, Mandarin Chinese, and Japanese are offered as language classes in the middle and upper school. While Nueva does not have honors or Advanced Placement classes, the school claims that most of the core classes "meet or exceed the rigor of Advanced Placement."

Among the upper school faculty, nearly 80% hold advanced degrees. Average standardized test scores at the upper school are 34 out of 36 for the ACT, 743 out of 800 on the reading and writing section of the SAT, and 760 out of 800 on the mathematics section of the SAT.

Starting in 2007, Nueva had one of the first design thinking programs for PreK-8, now PreK-12 students, providing every student with training in design thinking methodology, engineering classes, projects, and practices that are now central to Nueva's learning approach. The Innovation Lab (I-Lab) is a space on campus dedicated to design thinking projects, where engineers help students with projects.

The school's social emotional learning (SEL) curriculum, originally called Self-Science, has been part of a Nueva education since its founding. This curriculum teaches the skills of self-awareness, self-management, social awareness, relationship skills, and responsible decision-making. All teachers receive SEL training, and there are also dedicated SEL classes taught by specialists. Upper school SEL classes, called "Science of Mind," also cover psychology and neuroscience. The SEL curriculum was highlighted by Daniel Goleman in his book Emotional Intelligence.

Nueva's Menuhin-Dowling program, which teaches musical theory and practice to selected students in the first through eighth grades, was established by Sir Yehudi Menuhin and Helen Dowling.

Grading 
In the upper school, Nueva grades with written evaluations and rubrics instead of just letter grades. The grading is not just based on academic achievement, but also on soft skills like curiosity and self-improvement, which can be up to 30% of the grade in some classes. While students do receive letter grades in grades 10–12, in ninth grade classes are on a credit/no credit basis. Class rank is not computed, and there is no valedictorian. Nueva is part of the Mastery Transcript Consortium, a group of schools designing a form of transcript emphasizing mastery of specific skills instead of traditional grades.

Annual school trips 

Another element of a Nueva education is the annual trips program. Each year for grades one through twelve, students have a school trip. For first grade it is a one-night sleepover in the ballroom community space. For second, third, and fourth, students go on grade level camping trips. The second-grade trip is two days long, the third-grade trip is three days, and the fourth-grade trip is four. Fifth-grade students visit Crow Canyon Archaeological Center and the Four Corners region. Sixth grade students travel to Washington, DC. Seventh-grade students backpack in Yosemite National Park for five days, and then take a four-day trip to Ashland, Oregon, to attend the Shakespeare festival. Eighth grade students travel to Spain, China, or Japan depending upon their language study, and participate in a homestay. Ninth grade students go to Peru to visit Machu Picchu. Tenth grade students travel to Costa Rica to work with the Upwell Turtles and the Monteverde Institute in conjunction with their biology curriculum. Eleventh-grade students break up into several groups and travel to various locations in the United States as part of their American Studies curriculum. Twelfth-graders visit Argentina, Taiwan, France, and various other countries.

Extracurricular activities 

There are more than 50 clubs at Nueva, including for example,  a FIRST robotics team, an a cappella group, and a Dungeons and Dragons club. Nueva students have received national recognition for extracurricular achievement. Nueva students have won the public forum debate championship at the Tournament of Champions, won the U.S. Mathematical Olympiad and competed at the International Mathematics Olympiad, been finalists at the MathWorks Math Modeling Challenge, won second place at the Broadcom MASTERS science competition, been named a Davidson Fellow for research on Alzheimer's disease, won third place at the National Geographic Bee, won the Caroline D. Bradley Scholarship, and competed at the international Prix de Lausanne dance competition. Nearly 10% of Nueva's senior class won National Merit Scholarships in 2019.

Campus 

The lower school was originally located in Menlo Park but now is located on the site of the former W.H. Crocker Skyfarm mansion, which was purchased and donated to the school by the late W. Clement Stone.  The school moved to the mansion in 1971.

The remodeled mansion houses the lower school, grades pre-kindergarten to fourth. The middle school and classes for grades five to eight are also located on the Hillsborough campus and include the Hillside Learning Complex, the Cafe, library,  and administrative offices that serve the whole school.  Other campus facilities include a gymnasium/performance space, science labs, several playgrounds, art studios, and the "forts," a special outdoor play area. There is also the Innovation Lab (I-Lab), a maker-studio space with equipment including 3D printers, laser cutters, and construction tools that students use as part of the design thinking curriculum. The Hillsborough school campus has a gym/multipurpose room known as the GCC where students play sports ranging from basketball to volleyball. Nueva's 42 acre Hillsborough campus is tiered, having the middle school going down into Crocker Mansion, going down into the hiking/forts trail. Nueva's upper field includes a track and two soccer goals, as well as a scoreboard that was installed in 2013.

For the high school, established in 2013, a new campus of 133,000 square feet was built as part of the Bay Meadows development in San Mateo, opening in August 2014. It was designed by Leddy Maytum Stacy Architects. The construction of the campus cost $70 million, which was funded by a capital campaign and by debt. The inaugural ninth grade class was housed at the College of San Mateo while the construction of the high school campus was underway. The campus does not have individual offices for teachers; instead, they have clustered desks in common areas. The high school campus is located near the Hillsdale Caltrain station, which more than half the students use to commute to school.

Nueva's campuses have been recognized for their environmentally conscious design. The upper school campus gets 30% of its electricity from solar panels, using 65% less energy and 50% less water than a typical high school. The middle school campus's library has a living roof with native plants. The upper school campus was the first K-12 building in the United States to receive LEED Gold certification and has received the American Institute of Architects Award for School Design and Sustainability. Nueva was also one of 27 schools in the United States to be named a Green Ribbon School by the U.S. Department of Education in 2021 for its sustainable practices.

Finances 
Tuition for the Nueva School ranges from $30,555 for pre-kindergarten to $51,285 for high school, and the school gives around $5.5 million of financial aid per year. This tuition pays for 80% of Nueva's operating costs. Nueva has an endowment of $9 million. Controversially, it also received $2 million of federal loans from the Paycheck Protection Program during the pandemic in 2020.

Admissions 

Admission to the school in the eighth grade and below usually involves taking an IQ test: the Wechsler Preschool and Primary Scale of Intelligence, Fourth Edition (WPPSI-IV) for children under six years old, and the Wechsler Intelligence Scale for Children, Fifth Edition (WISC-V) for children six years old and older. The target range for admissions is a score of 130 and above. The admissions process also requires meeting with family, an activity session in a classroom setting, teacher evaluations, transcripts, and standardized test scores.

Notable alumni 
 Lisa Brennan-Jobs, writer and daughter of Apple co-founder Steve Jobs
 Jon Fisher, entrepreneur and investor
 Adam Klein, contestant on the TV show Survivor
Shemar Moore, actor
 Michaela Shiloh, songwriter and recording artist
 Jesse Thorn, broadcaster (NPR), podcaster and founder of the Maximum Fun podcasting network
Erik Goeddel, former Major League Baseball player and son of American molecular biologist David Goeddel
Tyler Goeddel, former Major League Baseball player and son of American molecular biologist David Goeddel

References

External links 

Education in San Mateo County, California
Private K-12 schools in California
1967 establishments in California